Ford Skyliner may refer to several vehicles produced by Ford in the United States:

 Ford Crestline Skyliner, produced for the 1954 model year only
 Ford Fairlane Crown Victoria Skyliner, produced for the 1955 and 1956 model years
 Ford Fairlane 500 Skyliner, produced for the 1957, 1958 and 1959 model years
 Ford Galaxie Skyliner, produced for the 1959 model year only
 Ford Transit Skyliner, concept based on the 2015 model year Ford Transit 350 passenger van